Comparative Political Studies is a peer-reviewed academic journal. It was established in 1968 by SAGE Publications, who continue to publish it today. The editors are David J. Samuels, University of Minnesota, and Benjamin W. Ansell, University of Oxford. The journal publishes methodological, theoretical, and research articles in the field of comparative politics at both the cross-national and intra-national levels.

Abstracting and indexing 
Comparative Political Studies is abstracted and indexed in Scopus and the Social Sciences Citation Index. According to the Journal Citation Reports, the journal has a 2017 impact factor of 2.919, ranking it 16th out of 169 journals in the category "Political Science".

See also 
 List of political science journals

References

External links
 

SAGE Publishing academic journals
Publications established in 1968
Monthly journals
Political science journals
English-language journals